Ceravolo is an Italian surname. Notable people with the surname include:

Fabio Ceravolo (born 1987), Italian footballer
Joseph Ceravolo (1934–1988), American poet

Italian-language surnames